Dr. Chaos, officially known as  in Japan, is an action-adventure game originally released in Japan for the Family Computer Disk System in 1987 by Pony Inc. An English localization was produced for the Nintendo Entertainment System that was released in North America by FCI in 1988.

Plot 
The story revolves around Dr. Ginn Chaos, a mad physicist who spends his time away from society doing secret experiments in his extensive mansion. His latest invention is an Interdimensional Warpgate which grants access to another world. Shortly arriving at the mansion to visit him is his younger brother, Michael. Michael quickly realizes that Ginn is missing. Making matters worse, the mansion's architecture is damaged, and is overrun with strange hostile creatures. Michael must now survive against the hostile creatures throughout the mansion, in his attempt to find his brother. Dr. Chaos is similar to Goonies II.

Gameplay 

The player assumes the role of Michael Chaos, who is armed with only a Knife in the beginning. However, as Michael moves through the house, he can pick up Handgun Bullets, Machine Gun Bullets, Grenades and life-replenishing Yellow Vitamins and Red Vitamins. There is a menu which has four options, open, get, go, and hit. There are 11 Warp Zones in all. At the end of each of the first 10 Warp Zones, Michael must fight a large monster that carries a piece of the Laser and guards a valuable piece of equipment, the latter consisting of the Ultra Space Sensor, four Life Bottles, the Air Helmet, the Jump Boots, two Blue Vitamins and the Shield Suit. Once Michael fully assembles the Laser, he'll be able to challenge the final boss, Canbarian.

References

External links 

1987 video games
Famicom Disk System games
Nintendo Entertainment System games
Platform games
Pony Canyon games
Video games developed in Japan

Single-player video games